William Hynes (born January 31, 1972) is an American professional auto racing driver and entrepreneur. He races full-time in the Stadium Super Trucks and has also competed in sports car and touring car racing. He is the founder and former CEO of United Fiber & Data, and has also overseen other business ventures such as Think Loud and 120 York.

He is nicknamed "The Thrill".

Early life
Hynes was born in New Brunswick, New Jersey on January 31, 1972. He attended Union Catholic Regional High School before moving to Hillside High School as a sophomore, though he returned to Union Catholic after getting involved in a fight. He graduated from Union Catholic in 1990.

As a junior, he enlisted in the United States Army Reserve as a military police officer. After graduating high school, he served in the Gulf War and was stationed in Panama. Hynes is a disabled veteran and honorably discharged.  

In 1996 and 1997, Hynes was a corrections officer recruit in the New Jersey Juvenile Justice Commission. He was later employed as an operations manager for Velocity Express in Lehigh Valley and a warehouse distribution supervisor for a Coca-Cola bottling plant in Philadelphia.

Business
Hynes, who has a degree in business administration, became a real estate agent in 2002, and had holdings in Arizona and Colorado. He founded 101st Holdings LLC and held two commercial properties before its closure due to the Great Recession. Other limited liability companies formed included ADS Builders East, Inner City Investments, BKS Investments, and BKS Technologies.

In 2011, Hynes founded Think Loud Development, an urban development firm aimed at economically struggling areas in Pennsylvania, alongside members of the rock band Live. The group also formed telecommunications company United Fiber & Data (UFD) in 2012. Live departed Think Loud in 2015.

In 2019, UFD constructed a 340-mile fiber-optic cable from Ashburn, Virginia to New York City. He resigned from his position as UFD's CEO in November 2019 following an arrest on burglary and stalking charges, though he remained on the company's board. In October 2020, UFD, Powder Mill Foundation, and Louis Appell III sued Hynes and fellow ex-CEO Chad Taylor for misusing the company's funding.  The case was amicably settled in August and Hynes cleared of any wrongdoing.

Racing career

A longtime racing fan and friend of Michael Andretti, Hynes began supporting Andretti's IndyCar Series team Andretti Autosport through United Fiber & Data in 2013 as an associate sponsor. UFD upgraded to a primary sponsorship on James Hinchcliffe's No. 27 car for 2014 on a one-year contract, and also sponsored the team's Indy Lights driver Matthew Brabham. The deal ended in 2015, which the Appell lawsuit alleged was worth $11 million a year and resulted in the company having to pay $9 million to the team. UFD returned to Andretti Autosport in 2016 as sponsors for Marco Andretti and Carlos Muñoz, and the former gained further backing the next season after original sponsor H. H. Gregg was on the verge of bankruptcy.

In 2014, he began racing in the Stadium Super Trucks at Honda Indy Toronto. After finishing seventh in his debut, he retired from the weekend's second race after four laps with a mechanical problem. UFD sponsored his truck, and the Team UFD Racing banner was formed to support multiple trucks over the following seasons including series champions Brabham and Paul Morris, SST's first female driver Sara Price, and SST race winners Arie Luyendyk Jr. and E. J. Viso. UFD also sponsored SST's 2017 race weekend at Watkins Glen International, dubbing it the UFD at The Glen. Hynes recorded his first SST podium at the 2015 Valvoline Raceway round in Australia, where he started on the pole and finished third.

In 2016, Hynes joined the newly formed EXR Racing Series, a supercar spec racing championship. He ran as high as second in points and finished fourth. The following year, EXR's endurance racing program debuted its Mitjet EXR LV02 car at the 25 Hours of Thunderhill, where Hynes was one of the five drivers and also worked as crew chief. In August, ​Hynes, Brabham, and Alexandre Prémat won the EXR class at the Utah Motorsports Campus 6 Hour Enduro.

At the 2017 Clipsal 500 weekend, Hynes ran the SST races in addition to making his Aussie Racing Cars debut. Later in the year at Barbagallo Raceway, he yielded his Aussie Racing Car to fellow SST drivers Sheldon Creed and Robby Gordon as he wanted to focus on SST.

Hynes won his first career SST race in the 2018 season opener at Lake Elsinore Diamond. He initially finished ninth, but video review found that Hynes had taken his mandatory Joker Lap prior to the final lap while many of the leaders waited until said lap, which was not allowed, due to a miscommunication with race officials. Consequently, many of the leaders were bumped down the running order while Hynes was promoted to first place, which he shared with the original winner Apdaly Lopez. He scored his third podium over a year later in the final race of the Gold Coast 600 round.

2022 saw Hynes' best statistical season to date as he finished fourth in points with two podiums at Mid-Ohio and Bristol.

Personal life
Hynes lives in Nazareth, Pennsylvania.

He appeared in a season 14 episode of The Celebrity Apprentice in 2015. In June 2020, he launched the ThrillCast podcast alongside Meg Jones. ThrillCast has sponsored his stadium truck.

Motorsports career results

Stadium Super Trucks
(key) (Bold – Pole position. Italics – Fastest qualifier. * – Most laps led.)

 The race was abandoned after Matt Mingay suffered serious injuries in a crash on lap three.
 Davey Hamilton Jr. led the most laps, but his disqualification resulted in Hynes receiving the bonus points.
 Standings were not recorded by the series for the 2020 season.

References

External links
 ThrillCast

1972 births
Living people
American military police officers
Businesspeople from Pennsylvania
Sportspeople from New Brunswick, New Jersey
Stadium Super Trucks drivers
Union Catholic Regional High School alumni
United States Army reservists
X Games athletes